Mata Menge is an early Middle Pleistocene paleoanthropological site located in the Ola Bula Formation in the So'a Basin on the island of Flores, Indonesia. Lithic artefacts and hominin remains have been discovered at the site. The level of sophistication of the Mata Menge lithic artefacts is described as being 'simple'.

Excavations

Stone Artifacts 
Stone artifacts make up the majority of what has been recovered from Mata Menge, most of the stone artifact evidence points towards use by the hominin H. floresiensis. The excavation by the Indonesian-Australian team in the period between 2004 and 2005 saw the excavation of over 487 stone artifacts. The stone artifacts were compared to others recovered in the 1994 excavation done by the Indonesian-Dutch team that yielded a whopping 507 artifacts, which is regarded as the most reputable and well-handled set of Early Pleistocene items found on a southeast Asian Island.

The stone tool artifacts found at the site were made using the simple method of breaking off smaller flakes from what is called a "core", essentially a larger piece of stone that is formed into one or multiple different tools. Volcanic materials were believed to have been used for these types of stone tools and due to the environmental history of the area, these materials were in abundance. Other material items found at the site were 27 fine-grained chert, 13 chalcedony, and 4 chlorite as well as 4 opal artifacts.

The majority of the flakes left behind from the core stones were believed to have been ignored after they were broken from the main piece, but some evidence of smaller ware on the larger flakes found could indicate the flakes being used as more precise tools, and evidence-based on the stone cores show the tools being made in one place and then carried with the hominin to another.

The evidence provided by the stone tools opened the possibility of hominin activity at Mata Menge. The similarities of the stone artifacts found at the Mata Menge site compared to those found at the Liang Bua site were close enough to consider evidence of H. floresiensis at Mata Menge as well. Later on, this would be confirmed in the 2014 excavation where hominin remains were found.

Faunal Remains 
The fossil remains of Stegodon florensis, crocodile and freshwater mollusk were also discovered.

Hominin fossils
In October 2014, the fossil remains of an early hominin were discovered at the site. A mandible and six teeth were discovered. The hominin fossils belonged to at least three distinct individuals. The hominin fossils were dated to around 700,000 BP, making the Mata Menge fossils the oldest hominin fossils yet discovered on the island of Flores. The fossils at Mata Menge are likely to belong to hominins that resulted from the effects of insular dwarfism working on Homo erectus.

47 lithic artefacts were discovered in the layer containing the hominin fossils. The remains of Stegodon florensis, Komodo dragon and crocodile were also discovered in the layer associated with the hominin fossil remains.

Comparison to H. floresiensis 
Hominin fossils at Mata Menge, in particular the mandible, are smaller than those of Homo floresiensis. The size and shape of the teeth of the Mata Menge fossils are similar to those of H. floresiensis, but the Mata Menge fossils are more primitive. The lithic artefacts at Mata Menge also show cultural similarities to those found at Liang Bua. The similarities in lithic artefacts and hominin fossil remains suggest that the hominins at Mata Menge were likely ancestral to H. floresiensis.

Environmental Effects at Mata Menge

Volcanic Activity 
Evidence from Mata Menge suggests that the area saw much volcanic activity that has affected items found at the excavation sites over the years. During excavations at Mata Menge in 2014, archaeologist and principal investigator Adam Brumm and his colleagues determined that Layer II of the site could be attributed to volcanic activity that had already occurred. The artifacts, faunal remains, including those being hominin in origin are believed to have been exposed at the surface for some time due to evidence of weathering, before then, being moved by nearby water and subsequently covered by various mud flows overtime. These mudflows may have been caused by volcanic activity in Welas Caldera, which eventually formed a lake. While Brumm and his team theorize that volcanic activity could also be the cause of other remains and artifacts being found at the site, other ideas are still open to possibility.

References

Bibliography

Archaeological sites in Indonesia
Flores Island (Indonesia)
Paleoanthropological sites
Prehistoric Indonesia